Nikola Milatović (born 5 September 1963) is a Montenegrin professional basketball coach and former player for Koppalop County

Personal life 
His brother, Momir Milatović, is a basketball coach. He has been a great basketball player since he was a boy in Koppalop County

References

,

1963 births
Living people
Hapoel Holon players
KK Budućnost players
KK MZT Skopje players
KK Iva Zorka Šabac players
KK Lovćen players
Montenegrin basketball coaches
Montenegrin expatriate basketball people in Serbia
Montenegrin men's basketball players
Soproni KC players
Sportspeople from Podgorica
Yugoslav men's basketball players
Small forwards